David Patrick Kelly (born January 23, 1951) is an American actor, musician and lyricist who has appeared in numerous films and television series. He is best known for his role as the main antagonist Luther in the cult film The Warriors (1979). Kelly is also known for his collaborations with Spike Lee, in the films Malcolm X (1992), Crooklyn (1994), and Chi-Raq (2015), and with David Lynch, appearing in Wild at Heart (1990) as well as Twin Peaks (1990–91) and its 2017 revival. 

Kelly's other credits include roles in 48 Hrs. (1982), Commando (1985), The Crow (1994), The Funeral and Last Man Standing (both 1996), The Longest Yard (2005), as President Harry S. Truman in Flags of Our Fathers (2006), and a recurring role in The Blacklist (2015).

Early life
Kelly was born in Detroit, Michigan to Margaret Elizabeth (Murphy) and Robert Corby Kelly, an accountant. His father received a Bronze Star Medal for service during the Battle of the Bulge in World War II. His grandfather, Daniel Murphy, was from Lisnashearshane, Duhallow, County Cork, Ireland. His great-grand-uncle was Father William Corby, chaplain of the Irish Brigade at the Battle of Gettysburg. As detailed in Corby's book, Memoir of Chaplain Life: 3 Years With the Irish Brigade, Father Corby eventually became president of the University of Notre Dame.

Kelly was given a mandolin on Saint Patrick's Day 1964 by his mother and considers that to have been the greatest influence on his artistic life.

As an undergraduate student, Kelly wrote the lyrics and music for four musicals produced in Detroit. These four productions were Lysistrata (by Aristophanes), The World from My Window (based on a book of children's poems), a project based on Gulliver's Travels (in the land of horses) and Home for Silent Clowns, a mime show with songs.

Kelly graduated cum laude with a Bachelor of Fine Arts from the University of Detroit, and was a student of Marcel Marceau and Mira Rostova.

Career

Film
In his debut role of Luther in the 1979 cult film The Warriors, Kelly screeches the famous line, "Warriors... come out to play-ee-ay!", which he improvised while clanging three empty beer bottles together. In the 1982 film 48 Hrs., starring Nick Nolte and Eddie Murphy, director Walter Hill rewrote a role for Kelly and again named the character "Luther".

Kelly's film credits include Commando (1985, as Sully), The Crow, Crooklyn, Hammett, Wild at Heart, Dreamscape, The Adventures of Ford Fairlane, Last Man Standing, Songcatcher, K-PAX, The Longest Yard', Flags of Our Fathers, John Wick (reprising his role as Charlie in John Wick: Chapter Two), and Chi-Raq. He appeared in the 1996 video game Ripper.

Television
Kelly's television guest appearances include Twin Peaks, Miami Vice, Moonlighting, Spenser: For Hire, Ghostwriter, Third Watch, Hack, Kidnapped, Law & Order, Law & Order: Criminal Intent, Law & Order: Special Victims Unit, Gossip Girl, Louie, Blue Bloods, The Blacklist, and Feed the Beast.

Stage
He performed in a few off-off-Broadway theater productions during the 1970s and 1980s. These included Wilford Leach's C.O.R.F.A.X. (Don't Ask), produced at La MaMa Experimental Theatre Club in 1975, and Ireneusz Iredyński's An Altar to Himself, as adapted by Michal Kobialka and Liz Diamond and directed by Virlana Tkacz at La MaMa in 1989. He also appeared in the April 1974 production of Mr. Jello, written and directed by George Birimisa, and then performed a song for which he wrote the music from Mr. Jello, at a benefit hosted by La MaMa to honor H.M. Koutoukas, called "For the Benefit of Harry", also in 1974. In 1976, he performed in La MaMa's "Cracker Club Country Fair Gala" in segments from Paul Foster's Silver Queen and Leonard Melfi's Horse Opera.

Kelly originated the role of Da in Once on Broadway, which was awarded the 2012 Tony Award for Best Musical. In 1998, he played Feste in the Lincoln Center production of Twelfth Night.

Kelly has frequently appeared at the Hartford Stage Company in Hartford, Connecticut, starring in the title roles in Georg Büchner's Woyzeck and Molière's Tartuffe. He played Iago in Othello and Hoss in Sam Shepard's Tooth Of Crime. At the American Repertory Theater in Cambridge, Massachusetts, he played the title role in Luigi Pirandello's Enrico IV and starred in an adaption of the Yuan dynasty classic Snow in June.

He has appeared in four plays by avant-garde playwright Richard Foreman: Pearls for Pigs, The Mind King, Film Is Evil/Radio Is Good, and The Cure.Theater listings compiled by Ruth Gilbert (January 6, 1992). New York,  p. 74. In 2015, he appeared as Michaud, alongside Keira Knightley, in the Roundabout Theatre Company's production of Helen Edmundson's adaptation of Thérèse Raquin in the Studio 54 space.

In 2022, Kelly played the Narrator and the Mysterious Man in Sondheim's Into the Woods at Encores! and later at the St. James Theatre on Broadway and on the 2023 national tour.

Music
As a composer and musician, Kelly participated in New York's rock and cabaret scene, playing such venues as Max's Kansas City, Reno Sweeney's, CBGB, and The Lower Manhattan Ocean Club. He wrote the music for the titular song of George Birimisa's Mr. Jello, which was produced at La MaMa in 1974.

In May 2008, he released an album of his original music titled David Patrick Kelly: Rip Van Boy Man, which contained new songs and live recordings from his club days in 1975.

Awards
Kelly played Dropshadow in David Lynch's film Wild At Heart, which won the Palme d'Or at Cannes in 1990. Kelly sang and played mandolin on the Grammy Award-winning soundtrack for the musical Once. He received a Connecticut Critics Circle Award for his performance in Tartuffe at Hartford Stage, and was nominated for a Lucille Lortel Award for his performance in Nathan Louis Jackson's When I Come To Die'' at LCT3 in Manhattan. In 1998, Kelly received an Obie Award for sustained excellence for his theater work in classics, new plays, and the avant-garde.

Personal life
Kelly married theater actress and writer Juliana Francis at St. Mark's Church in-the-Bowery in Manhattan on August 14, 2005. They have a daughter named Margarethe Jane Kelly born in 2008.

Acting credits

Film

Television

Video games

Theatre

References

External links
 
 
 
 
 Kelly's page on La MaMa Archives Digital Collections

1951 births
American male film actors
American male television actors
American male stage actors
American people of Irish descent
Living people
Male actors from Detroit
University of Detroit Mercy alumni